Daniel Wayne Hardy (November 9, 1930 – November 15, 2007) was an ordained Anglican priest or presbyter.

His contributions
One of his closest friends, Peter Ochs, described him as “a pastor's pastor – seeing light in the other, light as attractiveness in and with the other. He is a pastor of others within the Eucharist; within the Anglican Communion, a pastor on behalf of Abrahamic communions and to human communities more generally.... all of whom he sees lit up by (the) divine attractiveness itself.... the great cosmic and ecclesial and divine communion of lights which draws him to it and us and draws us to be near him.”

His vocation has been primarily about the king God's wisdom. It has been prophetic insofar as it has attempted to engage more deeply with life in all its particularity. It has been priestly in tracing that prophetic wisdom to its source in the divine intensity of love and in seeking to mediate that love through the church for the whole world, concentratedly in the Eucharist: light and love together.

Secondly, his vocation is a tribute to the thinker who has perhaps more than any other been his teacher and inspiration over many decades, Samuel Taylor Coleridge.  He recognized that Coleridge engaged deeply with God and most aspects of God's creation – intellectually, imaginatively, practically, spiritually, emotionally, and through much personal suffering. Above all Coleridge responded in all those ways to the attraction of the divine. He discerned the Word and the Spirit endlessly present, active, and innovative, lifting the world from within, raising it into its future - giving us a huge hope in God and God's future, and inviting us intensively and unremittingly to participate in it, as we are drawn through divine love into levels of existence of which we can hardly begin to imagine or dare to dream.

His career
The genesis of his vocation to ordination lay in his years as a student in Haverford College and in finding of himself before God, which was encouraged and enabled by participation in his regular Quaker worship. The rhythm and pattern of worship of General Theological Seminary was the most formative influence on Hardy during his time as a student there. It provided a daily invitation to go deeper into the intensity of God, an attraction that has perhaps been the most fundamental dynamic of his life.

His title post (served in Christ Episcopal Church, Greenwich, Connecticut) added a second key dynamic. This is exemplified best through his engagement with a group of young people. He began by engaging with what mattered and was significant to them, and then trusting, discerning, and helping them to recognize the source and energy of life (God's Spirit) already at work within their lives and making deep connections with the truth of the Gospel. The group began to thrive in a short space of time. The curacy culminated in helping to design the new daughter church of St. Barnabas, strengthening interest in architecture that in later years has proved fruitful again and again both with actual buildings and with the architectonics of theology and institutions.

He returned to General Theological Seminary as a fellow and tutor for two years, accompanied by his wife Perrin, who, together with their growing family, grew to be the cantus firmus of his life. The experience of teaching and a sense of the need for theological thinking led to further study at Oxford University. Yet that was in many ways a painful disappointment, finding a theology that was too influenced by positivist philosophy and rarely confident enough to explore the depths and wonders of God and God's ways with the world.

The twenty-one years that followed were spent teaching at the University of Birmingham. The 'golden thread' of those rich and varied years was the pursuit of theology that might give dedicated attention both to the intensity of God and to the way the world is, especially as described, interpreted, and explained by theologians, philosophers, and scientists since the sixteenth century. Exploring and testing their thought was a slow and often lonely task, but for several hours each week, he maintained intensive conversations with the colleague who later became his son-in-law, David F. Ford.

Moving to the Van Mildert Professor of Divinity in Durham University and a canon in Durham Cathedral brought him back to a combination of daily worship and academic work. During those years, he dedicated himself to a multifaceted involvement in ecclesiology that has remained at the forefront of his thinking ever since.

He recrossed the Atlantic to be Director of the Princeton Center of Theological Inquiry for five years. Much of his time there was spent thinking about the Center (along lines now happily being pursued by the current Director) and king closely with individual members from many disciplines and many countries. But, judged in terms of long-term results, it is probably the relationship with one member, the Jewish philosopher Peter Ochs of the University of Virginia, that was the most fruitful. Peter, David F. Ford (of the University of Cambridge) and he have spent much time over many years since the early 1990s working together with others developing the practice of Scriptural Reasoning, the shared study of our scriptures by Jews, Christians, and Muslims.

Hardy returned to England in 1995, and to an active retirement based in the Faculty of Divinity at the University of Cambridge. His involvement in the 1998 Lambeth Conferences and participation in some of the Primates' meetings during the years that followed made him long for a reconciliatory imagination and practice centered on scripture and nurturing a deeper and richer sociality, touching healingly the depths of each person.

In October 2007, he received an honorary doctorate recognizing him for his life work from the General Theological Seminary.

Death
On November 15, 2007, Hardy died from a glioblastoma .

Works
Living in Praise: Worshipping and Knowing God (with David F. Ford) (Nov. 2005). London: Darton Longman & Todd; Grand Rapids: Baker Academic.
God's Ways With the World (Academic Paperback) (Mar. 2005)
Finding the Church: The Dynamic Truth of Anglicanism (Feb. 2002). London: SCM Press.
God's Ways With the World: Thinking and Practicing Christian Faith (Sep. 1996). Edinburgh: T & T Clark.
On Being the Church: Essays on the Christian Community (with Colin Gunton) (Feb. 1989). Edinburgh: T & T Clark.
Praising and Knowing God by Daniel W. Hardy (with David F. Ford) (May 1985)
Jubilate: Theology in Praise (with David F. Ford) (Paperback - Sep 1984)

References

External links
  His dying wish: to go on talking about God Book review by John Saxbee, Church Times, 22 March 2011.

1930 births
2007 deaths
20th-century Church of England clergy
Anglican theologians
Deaths from brain cancer in England
Neurological disease deaths in England